Fictional games are games which were specifically created for works of fiction, or which otherwise originated in fiction.

Many fictional games have been translated into real games by fans or ludophiles by creating pieces and rules to fit the descriptions given in the source work. For example, unofficial versions of Fizzbin can be found in reality, and Mornington Crescent is widely played in online forums.

Billiards games
Dom-Jot - Star Trek: The Next Generation, a game similar to bumper pool played on an irregularly-shaped table

Board games
Azad - a tactical game featured in the novel The Player of Games by Iain M. Banks
Cyvasse - a strategy game in George R.R. Martin's A Song of Ice and Fire series, which appears to be a combination of Chess and Battleship
Dejarik or Holochess - a variant of chess played in the Star Wars setting
Gatlopp - a drinking game from the film Gatlopp: Hell of a Game
Gungi - a strategy game in the Hunter × Hunter manga and anime. It is played on a non-checkered gameboard with 81 squares arranged in a 9×9 grid, and has 13 different types of pieces and several stacked constructs.
Icehouse - The Empty City by Andrew Looney; an example of a fictional game that now exists as a real-world one
Jetan - a chess-like strategy game from the Edgar Rice Burroughs novel The Chessmen of Mars
Jumanji - a magical board game from the book and movie of the same name, later released in a variant as a real game
Kadis-kot - a board game first seen in the Star Trek: Voyager episode "Infinite Regress"
Liar's Lament – a board game first seen in the Pretty Little Liars episode "Playtime"
Pai Sho - a strategy game first seen in the Avatar: The Last Airbender episode "The Waterbending Scroll" (S1E9)
Stars and Comets - in Andre Norton novels
Stealth Chess - a chess variant played in the Ankh-Morpork Assassins' Guild, in which pieces move invisibly; Discworld
Sazou - A game similar to Chess played on Draconia and Gallifrey in Doctor Who.
Survivor - a two-player game in Return to Zork. The game is asymmetric, and the Zork player character must ultimately win two games, one as each of the Survivor players, to complete Return to Zork.
Tadek - a strategy game in the Farscape episode "The Flax" that involves building holographic columns while pushing game pieces around a board; the game can be used for gambling
Tak - a strategy game in The Name of the Wind by Patrick Rothfuss, later developed into a real game. 
Three-Cornered Pitney - unplayable board game invented by Mad Magazine
Three-Dimensional Chess - a strategy game first seen in the Star Trek episode "Where No Man Has Gone Before", later developed into a real game
Thud  - a chess-like game of Trolls and Dwarves appearing in Terry Pratchett's novel of the same name
Wizard's chess - a variant of chess in the Harry Potter universe, featuring magically animated, intelligent pieces
Zathura - a Jumanji-like game from the book of the same name and the film Zathura: A Space Adventure.

Card games
Caravan - A two player card game used for both gambling and passing time in Fallout: New Vegas.
Cripple Mr. Onion - Discworld; Fan rules have been created, but are not official, and use ordinary playing cards rather than a Discworld "Caroc" deck.
Double Fanucci - a fictional card game mentioned throughout the Zork series of computer adventure games.
Dragon Poker - the MythAdventures books by Robert Asprin
Fizzbin - Star Trek
Go Johnny Go Go Go Go - is a comedy fictional card game from the television series, The League of Gentlemen from the Series 2 episode, "A Plague on Royston Vasey".
Gwent - A card game in the novel series The Witcher. Later available as a video game.
Lucky Horseshoes - A variant of Blackjack found in Fallout: New Vegas, played with an animatronic cowboy in exchange for in-game rewards.
Tongo - Star Trek: Deep Space Nine TV series
Triad - Battlestar Galactica (2004 series)
Triple Triad - first appearing in the video game Final Fantasy VIII, it can also be played as a minigame in Final Fantasy XIV: A Realm Reborn and Final Fantasy Portal App.  In 1999, after the release of Final Fantasy VIII, toy company, Bandai, produced a real Triple Triad card deck.  Since the game was only produced in Japan and not readily available in America and Europe, the cards have become rare collector's items.
Sabacc - a card game used for gambling in Star Wars, and the game in which Han Solo won the Millennium Falcon from Lando Calrissian. Real versions of the game have been produced and can be bought at Disneyland.

MMORPGS/Role-playing games
Bunkers & Badasses - a parody of Dungeons & Dragons, the central game played in Tiny Tina's Assault on Dragon Keep, a DLC of the video game Borderlands 2
The Game - a parody of World of Warcraft, the unnamed MMORPG is played by the central characters of The Guild web series
Raven's Banquet - the expansion pack featured in the first season of Mythic Quest, designed for the MMORPG of the same name
Kingdom Scrolls - from the British television series Dead Pixels
HackMaster and its many spinoffs - Knights of the Dinner Table
OASIS - a virtual world and MMORPG featured in Ready Player One by Ernest Cline

Sports

Athletic sports
Assassin's Guild Wall Game - " a cross between squash, urban rock climbing and actual bodily harm", Discworld (named after the Eton Wall Game)
Indoor hang gliding - Geoff Maltby in the television series Benidorm claims to be North West champion of it
Lifting - popular extreme sport, similar to surfing, but in the air; practitioners ride "reflection boards" on waves of "Transparence Light Particles"; from anime/manga series Eureka Seven
Taking the Stone - in Farscape, a game played by the youth of an unnamed royal cemetery planet. The game consists of jumping into a deep well, and chanting while falling. To protect a participant from smashing into the bottom of the well and dying, there is a sonic net which is sustained by the participants' voices, and provides a nice soft landing. Well, most of the time.

Combat sports
Anbo-Jitsu - Star Trek: The Next Generation, a one-on-one martial arts combat sport wherein the players are blindfolded and use proximity-detector staves to locate the opponent
Ape Fighting - from Futurama, a fighting sport involving two apes (typically gorillas) engaging in pugilistic combat while adorned with comically-undersized costumes and props
The Hunger Games - from the books and movies of the same name. Each year, adolescents from oppressed districts are forced to fight to the last survivor in an elaborate outdoor arena, itself designed to pose many threats to tributes' lives, for the entertainment of citizens in the wealthy Capitol district.
The Running Man - from The Running Man, the titular television show features convicted criminals fighting for their lives (and pardons) in an arena while being hunted down by professional celebrity mercenaries called "stalkers", presented in the same vein as theme-based pro-wrestlers
Kosho - from The Prisoner, Kosho appeared prominently in the episode “It’s Your Funeral.” According to Kosho rules, one opponent must knock the other into a four-by-eight foot tank of water. Trampolines are placed on two sides of the pool and ledges above on three. Upon successful dunking, the Kosho match is over.

Team ball sports
43-Man Squamish - fictional college sport from Mad Magazine
Arena Stickball - Fictional sport from Alternia, in both Homestuck and Hiveswap wherein two teams of 5 players compete to score points using 16 different balls. The game is played over two 11-hour halves.
BASEketball - from the movie of the same name
Blernsball - 30th-century version of baseball, Futurama, called the "Earthican Pastime"
Blitzball - Final Fantasy X, a soccer-like game played in a massive sphere of water
Blitzball - a game created by Phineas in the novel A Separate Peace
Calvinball - a game where there are only two rules: players must wear masks, and you can never play the same way twice; Calvin and Hobbes by Bill Watterson
 Grifball - A violent rugby-style game where two teams try to bring bombs to their own goal, as seen in Halo 3 (2007).
HyperBlade - an ultraviolent variant of ice hockey played on an ellipsoidal rink with either a puck or a severed head, from the PC game of the same name
Moopsball - team sport created by Gary Cohn in Rules for Moopsball (1976), referenced in Legion of Superheroes and in Gene Wolfe's There Are Doors
Pyramid - a basketball-like game featured in Battlestar Galactica
Quidditch - Harry Potter series by J. K. Rowling, a team sport with four balls and seven players on each team who ride around on broomsticks
Quodpot - Quidditch Through the Ages by J. K. Rowling
Speedball - futuristic and violent mix of handball and hockey featured in the cyberpunk inspired games of the same name
 Zero-Grav Hyperball - A sport played with rackets and balls played on Gallifrey, as shown in Doctor Who.

Non-team ball sports
Electro-Magnetic Golf - from Brave New World
Escalator Squash - from Brave New World
Igo Soccer - the participants have to do figures with some pebbles and a ball, sport from the Japanese shõnen Nichijō
Gonnis - A combination of golf and tennis featured in the BBC comedy series Look Around You, a parody of science and technology programming.

Other sports

Apopudobalia - encyclopedia fictitious entry
Bungee Ball - Teenage Mutant Ninja Turtles: Fast Forward
Frolf - Ribbit King
Futuresport - from the movie of the same name
German batball - from Kurt Vonnegut's novel The Sirens of Titan
Guyball - ball game played by Green Wing's Dr Guy Secretan.
Hadaul - from Jack Vance's Demon Princes book The Face
Hussade - from Jack Vance's Alastor series
Jugger - the movie The Blood of Heroes
The Game - From Piers Anthony's Apprentice Adept series of novels; includes almost all known games and competitions; winners of the yearly Tourney get to become Citizens
Light Cycle racing - a race on virtual motorcycles in the Tron franchise
The Long Walk - from a Richard Bachman/Stephen King book of the same name
Motorball - from the Battle Angel Alita manga
Parrises Squares - an athletic, full-contact sport in Star Trek
Podracing - violent vehicular racing sport from Star Wars wherein the pilots of "pods" - massive, twin-engined hover vehicles - participate in a high-tech version of chariot racing
Redline  - a car elimination race in the film Redline (2009 film)
Rollerball - from William Harrison's story "Roller Ball Murder", on which the movie Rollerball was loosely based
Skeet Surfin' - a mixture of surfing and skeet shooting depicted in a musical parody of The Beach Boys in film Top Secret!
Sky-surfing - appearing in numerous Judge Dredd stories
Transcontinental Road Race - Death Race 2000

Video games 
Polybius - The subject of an urban legend pertaining to an alleged 1981 arcade game. The game has made appearances in various media.
Fix-It Felix Jr., Sugar Rush, Hero's Duty, and Slaughter Race - games from Wreck-It Ralph (2012) and its sequel Ralph Breaks the Internet (2018)
The Game - a head-mounted virtual reality game in the Star Trek: The Next Generation episode "The Game" (S5E06)
Global Thermonuclear War and Falken's Maze - a military simulation program mistaken for a computer game and a computer game to be played by an artificial intelligence in WarGames (1983)
Alien Child and Perfect Mom - games from the movie Her (2013)
Bonestorm and Lee Carvallo's Putting Challenge - games appearing in the Simpsons episode Marge Be Not Proud
Chinpokomon - a parody of the Pokémon franchise that appears in the South Park episode of the same name
Sentries of the Last Cosmos - a VR game in the Batman Beyond episode of the same name.  The game and creator are portrayed very similarly to Star Wars and George Lucas.
Space Paranoids - an arcade game created by Kevin Flynn and featured in Tron (1982)
Ninja Ninja Revolution - an arcade game appearing in Scott Pilgrim vs. the World (2010)
Feathered Serpent - a computer game created by Damian Cray in the Alex Rider TV show
The Game - unnamed title published by fictional company Game Punch in the TV show I Feel Bad
Kebab Fighter - a parody of Street Fighter II that appears in the cartoon sitcom The Amazing World of Gumball
Buzz Lightyear: Attack on Zurg - a Super Nintendo game that appears at the beginning of Toy Story 2 (1999)
Wrestle Jam 88 - from the movie The Wrestler (2008)
Bandersnatch, Nohzdyve, and Metl Hedd - games from Black Mirror: Bandersnatch (2018)
CURS>R - a text-based adventure game from Choose or Die (2022)

Other games
Chula - in the Star Trek: Deep Space Nine episode "Move Along Home"
The Glass Bead Game - Hermann Hesse's novel of the same name
Mornington Crescent - I'm Sorry I Haven't a Clue radio comedy programme
Poohsticks - Winnie-the-Pooh
Quis - a building game from the Saga of the Skolian Empire novels by Catherine Asaro involving the laying down of geometric solid shapes (dice) in various combinations; rules contain encoded knowledge of one of the former empires in the novel series
Sej – a dicing game played in Serpent's Reach
True American - in New Girl, a game that is 50% drinking, 50% Candy Land, and also the floor is lava

See also
 List of games in Star Trek
 List of games with concealed rules

References

Fictional games
Fictional video games
Games
Fictional